Eastern Airlines, LLC is an American airline founded in 2010. Eastern operates Boeing 767s and Boeing 777s. It began as Dynamic Airways and later added "International" to its name to reflect its transition from a charter airline into scheduled international services. Under the Dynamic name, the airline was headquartered in High Point, North Carolina, offering service from New York to South America. It used to operate from Fort Lauderdale, Chicago, Los Angeles and New York to the Caribbean, Cancún, and South America.

Following a successful bankruptcy restructuring in April 2018, Dynamic International Airways obtained a license to use the Eastern intellectual property from Swift Air, and the leases of two aircraft from the 2015 Eastern Air Lines startup. Dynamic was rebranded as Eastern Airlines.

History

Dynamic Airways

Dynamic Airways was established by Dynamic Aviation in 2010, with its first aircraft being a second-hand McDonnell Douglas MD-88 delivered a year before operations started in 2009. The airline officially started operations in early October 2010 after receiving its air operator's certificate.

On November 2010, the airline started to operate for Direct Air. The company's first aircraft was re-painted in livery and leased to Direct Air.

As the airline approached its second year of operations, its first Boeing 767-200 was delivered to the airline, followed by the approval for another MD-88 to take to the skies.

Not long after the purchase of the second MD-88, Dynamic announced a three-year partnership flying for Hoda Air Services in South Korea. The deal, which included a MD-88 supported by a full crew, was the airline's first in Asia. The airline continued to expand when its first 767 entered service and the second was delivered, which was, according to the airline, available for ACMI wet lease, full charter and corporate shuttle programs for private and government organisations'.

In March 2012, Direct Air temporarily suspended its operations and cancelled all charter flights, subsequently filing for bankruptcy. It ceased operations completely shortly after, having been found to have racked up millions in debts. The MD-88 was returned to Dynamic as a result. A third 767 was delivered to Dynamic on March 6. This 767 entered operations in early 2013.

Dynamic operated a successful wet-lease ACMI for EZjet, operating regular flights from New York City to Georgetown utilizing their 767-200. This operation ceased in 2012, prompting Dynamic's move into regularly-scheduled services, starting with the resurrection of the New York to Georgetown route in June 2014, competing with Caribbean Airlines and Fly Jamaica Airways on that route, the latter two flying the route as a fifth-freedom service.

In 2015, Dynamic also added services from Fort Lauderdale, flying to both Caracas and Rio de Janeiro. In 2016, Dynamic added new routes from New York to the Caribbean and Latin America, commencing service to Caracas (filling a void left after American Airlines canceled that same route) Cancún, and Punta Cana, and entered both the Chicago and Los Angeles markets, with service from Chicago to both Punta Cana and Cancún, and from Los Angeles to Cancún and San Juan, although the latter was later withdrawn prior to launch. By August 2016, however, all of the new routes except for the New York to Caracas route had been cancelled, as well as the Fort Lauderdale to Caracas service. Soon after those cancellations, Mexican low-cost carrier Interjet began operating some of the canceled routes to and from Cancún.

After summer of 2017, Dynamic withdrew from scheduled services and re-focused as an ACMI operator. In November 2017, Dynamic and its affiliated airline Swift Air went bankrupt.

Eastern Airlines

Dynamic exited bankruptcy, and with the rights held by Swift Air, renamed itself as Eastern Airlines in April 2018. The company adopted plans similar to the prior Eastern Air Lines Group. The airline's viability was to be based on route selection, mostly secondary locations in South America and China. But while the destinations were under-served, there may not have been enough demand to be profitable. The company applied for four non-stop routes, three of them international, from its proposed JFK New York hub. It assembled a fleet of eight Boeing 767s and used them to furnish charter services in North American and Europe. With the Boeing 737 MAX groundings, Eastern provided charters for Sunwing Airlines.

On September 1, 2019, the company moved into its new Systems Operations Control center in Wayne, Pennsylvania. At the end of the month, Eastern joined the British Civil Aviation Authority in the largest-ever peacetime repatriation of British citizens after the collapse of Thomas Cook Airlines, operating flights to bring stranded overseas holidaymakers back to the UK.

On January 12, 2020, Eastern Airlines completed its inaugural flight to New York from Guayaquil, Ecuador. By May 2020, Eastern planned to purchase several Boeing 767s, with at least five used 777-200s. On September 1, 2021, Eastern Airlines announced the creation of a new cargo subsidiary name Eastern Air Cargo and the addition of 35 Boeing 777 preighters to their fleet.

Ownership
Until 2017, Dynamic Airways was owned as follows,
 
 Kenneth M. Woolley (50%) - founder and chief information officer (and former CEO) of Extra Space Storage. Woolley also co-owns Swift Air, another Part 121 carrier, in association with Swift Transportation, and is the owner of KMW Leasing, an aircraft leasing firm.
 Paul Kraus (50%) - owner of Jet Midwest Group, an aircraft leasing firm.
After a successful bankruptcy restructuring in 2017, Dynamic Airways is now  owned by Olga Alauof (70%) and Woolley (30%)

Destinations

As of December 2022, Eastern Airlines flies to the following destinations:

Fleet

Current fleet

As of February 2023, the Eastern Airlines fleet includes the following aircraft:

Former fleet
As Dynamic Airways, the airline formerly operated the following aircraft:

Accidents and incidents
On October 29, 2015, Dynamic Airways Flight 405, a Boeing 767-200ER (registered N251MY), was taxiing at Fort Lauderdale–Hollywood International Airport when its left-hand engine caught on fire. Fire crews were dispatched to the scene and all 101 passengers and crew were safely evacuated from the aircraft. 17 passengers and 5 crew members were reported as sustaining injuries. Aircraft operations were briefly suspended at the airport.

On July 15, 2020, a Boeing 767-300ER (registered N706KW), from New York City to Georgetown, taxied off the taxiway at Cheddi Jagan International Airport upon landing, after it vacated Runway 24. Almost immediately after turning onto Taxiway Charlie, the aircraft’s right main landing gear rolled off the pavement and became stuck in the grass. All 201 passengers and 10 crew members were safely evacuated from the aircraft with no injuries.

See also
Eastern Air Lines
Eastern Air Lines (2015)
List of airlines of the United States

References

External links

Official website

2010 establishments in North Carolina
Companies that filed for Chapter 11 bankruptcy in 2017
Airlines established in 2010
Airlines based in Pennsylvania
Eastern Air Lines
Charter airlines of the United States